Harry Russell may refer to:

 Harry Russell (rugby league), rugby league footballer who played in the 1930s
 Harry Russell (footballer), English footballer
 Harry Luman Russell (1866–1954), American bacteriologist and educator
 Scott Russell (tenor) (Harry Henry Russell, 1868–1949), English singer, actor and theatre manager